Kartsakhi also spelled Kartsakh and Karzakh  is a village in Akhalkalaki Municipality, Samtskhe–Javakheti, Georgia. It is located on the bank of Kartsakhi Lake, the second largest lake in the country.

History 
The village is located on the road connecting Akhalkalaki to the border with Turkey. The Karcachi railway station is the last stop on the Georgian side of the Baku–Tbilisi–Kars railway.

Near the village there is the Kartsakhi nature reserve.

Notable people
Jivani (1846–1909)
Karapet Chobanyan (1927–1978)

References 

Populated places in Samtskhe–Javakheti
Geography of Samtskhe–Javakheti